La Mar, also known by its Maya name Rabbit Stone, is the modern name for a ruined city of the pre-Columbian Maya civilization located in the state of Chiapas in Mexico. During the 8th century AD, it was an ally of the nearby center Piedras Negras. Stela 12 at Piedras Negras, identifies one of the kings of La Mar as being named Parrot Chaak.

References

External links
Entry on Mesoweb

Maya sites in Chiapas
Archaeological sites in Mexico
Former populated places in Mexico
Populated places established in the 8th century BC
8th-century BC establishments in the Maya civilization
8th century in the Maya civilization